Joseph Butler (1692–1752) was an English bishop, theologian, apologist, and philosopher.

Joseph Butler may also refer to:

Sportspeople
 Joe Butler (boxer) (1864–1941), American boxer
 Joe Butler (footballer, born 1879) (1879–1941), English goalkeeper for Stockport County, Clapton Orient, Glossop, Sunderland & Lincoln City
 Joe Butler (footballer, born 1943), English football defender for Newcastle United and Swindon Town
 Joey Butler (born 1986), baseball player
 Jos Buttler (born 1990), English cricketer

Others
 Joseph Butler (architect) (1804–1884), English architect, surveyor and builder
 Joseph Butler (merchant) (1862–1934), New Zealand sawmiller and timber merchant
 Joseph G. Butler Jr. (1840–1927), American industrialist, philanthropist, and popular historian
 Joseph George Butler (1869–?), British politician and trade unionist
 Joseph Niklaus Bütler (1822–1885), Swiss painter
 Joe Butler (Joseph Campbell Butler, born 1941), musician, founding member of The Lovin' Spoonful

See also